This list of mines in Norway is subsidiary to the list of mines article and lists working, defunct and future mines in the country and is organised by the primary mineral output. For practical purposes stone, marble and other quarries may be included in this list.

Coal
Camp Morton, Svalbard

Copper
Jakobsbakken

Iron
Bjørnevatn mine

Phosphate
Ødegården Verk

Silver
Kongsberg Silver Mines

Titanium
Engebø mine
Engebøfjell mine
Kodal mine
Ødegårdite mine
Rødsand mine
Selvåg mine
Storgangen mine
Tellnes mine

Tungsten
Målviken mine

Zinc
Allmannajuvet
Jakobsbakken

References

Norway